Love Family is a 2013 till 2014 Taiwanese romance, family, comedy television series produced by Sanlih E-Television. Starring Chris Wang and Serena Fang as the main leads, with Jack Lee and Amanda Chou as the main supporting leads. The Chinese title literally translates to "A Loving Family", which is in reference to the main female lead's character family. Filming took place from October 9, 2013 till January 29, 2014 and was filmed as the drama aired. First original broadcast began October 29, 2013 on SETTV channel airing weekly from Monday till Friday at 8:00-9:00 pm. Final episode aired on February 10, 2014 with 72 episodes total.

Synopsis
Rich heir Wan Sheng Ren has only 100 days to find a girl he briefly encountered when he was young that he calls "Little Angel" or else his parents will force him into an arranged marriage in order to inherit the family business. The problem with finding his "Little Angel" is he doesn't know her name or remember how to go to the place where he first met her since he was only seven than. One day he sees on television a family run inn with the same flower logo as the handkerchief "Little Angel" left for him. He heads out to find his "Little Angel", but when he arrives at the inn he's not sure who exactly is his "Little Angel", so he decides to apply for a job at the inn in order to try and figure out who "Little Angel" is.

Plot summary
Wan Sheng Ren is the heir to the Wan Sing Hotel Group. Despite his family's wealthy background, he is a kind and gentle person who like to dress casually, open to trying regular everyday people food and not afraid to work hard. However being an only child his mother has made a rule that Sheng Ren must marry by the age of thirty in order to inherit the family business. Since he has no future wife prospect lined up, his mother offers to set him up on an arranged marriage. Not wanting to go through that process he ask his mother if he can find his "Little Angel", a little girl he met when he was young who tended to him after he scraped his knee, but he never got the chance to ask for her name or remember how to go back to the place where he met her. Only thing he has to remember her by is a handkerchief that she used to tend to his wound. By chance one day he sees on television a travel program covering a family run inn in the mountains that has the same logo as "Little Angel's" handkerchief. The next day he and his assistant Long Shi sets out to find his "Little Angel", when they arrive at the inn they encounter the unpleasant young lady Xu You Ai, that they had met the day before at the megamarket.

Xu You Ai is the oldest daughter of the Xu family and owns the Happy House Inn. She is frugal but can be unpleasant and demanding. She also wants to make the family inn successful by treating all the guess like part of her family when they stay there. She meets Wan Sheng Ren at the megamarket. The two start off at the wrong foot because of her competitive nature she thinks he is one of the shoppers trying to fight with her for the hourly store sale item. However, when the market announces a couples only contest to win 10 cases of instant ramen noodles, You Ai involuntarily has Sheng Ren be her partner in order to enter the contest. After winning the contest she only gives Sheng Ren six packets of noodles out of all the 10 cases they have won. When Sheng Ren is hired as a helping hand at the inn she works him to the bone in hard labor.

Not knowing who his "Little Angel" is Sheng Ren and Shi pretends to be answering the help wanted at the inn as helping hands to work at the inn and hide their true identities until they can figure out which young lady is his "Little Angel". Unpleasant and fierce oldest daughter Xu You Ai, soft-spoken middle daughter Xu You Qing who is also a mother, spoiled youngest daughter Xu You Meng who has a spending problem, and You Ai's best friend Zhang Yin Yin who is blunt and opinionated.

Cast

Main cast
Chris Wang 宥勝 as Wan Sheng Ren 萬聖仁
Serena Fang 房思瑜 as Xu You Ai 許有愛
Jack Lee 李運慶 as Long Shi 龍十
Amanda Chou 周曉涵 as Zhang Yin Yin 張茵茵

Supporting cast

Happy House Inn (Xu family)
Shen Meng-sheng 沈孟生 as Xu Han Yuan 許漢元
Linda Liu 劉瑞琪 as Lin Zhao Jun 林昭君
Yin Fu 茵芙 as Xu You Qing 許有情
Rabbit Yang 楊可涵 as Xu You Meng 許有夢
Eason Chao 趙乙丞 as Wang Yu Lun 王宇倫

Wan Sing Hotel Group (Wan family)
Guan Yong 關勇 as Wan Tian Long 萬天龍
Lin Xiu Jun 林秀君 as Lou Xiao Feng 羅曉楓

Zhang family
Yen Chia Le 顏嘉樂 as Wang Xiu Xian 王秀賢
Sean Lee 邵翔 as Zhang Han Wen 張翰文

Extended casts
Lin Wei Yi 林惟毅 as Zhuang Kai Hua 莊開華
Zhao Jie 趙杰 as Wang Shun Cheng 王順成
Lin Jun Yong 林埈永 (綠茶) as Song Zheng Qi 宋正期
Shaun Chen 陳泓宇 as Li Cong Wei 李崇威
Hope Lin 林可彤 as Fang An Ting 方安婷

Guest role
Albee Liu 劉堇萱 as Nurse 護士
Huang Taian 黃泰安 as Male tenant 男房客
Chang Kuo-tung 張國棟 as Chen Zhi Xiong 陳志雄
Yu Jia An 于家安 as Jin Hua 金花
Mandy Tao 陶嫚曼 as Momo Tao Zhi 陶子
Gina Lim 林利霏 as Yin Jia Hui 尹家慧
Irene 豆豆 as Ling Ling 玲玲
Qin Zhen 蓁勤 as Grandmother 奶奶
Paul Hsu 許騰方 as Andy
Gao Zheng-peng 高振鵬 as Lo Yu Cheng 羅裕程
Gloria 玓靜 as Ai Mi Li 愛蜜莉

Soundtrack
Don't Ask 不要問 by Della Ding Dang 丁噹
I'm Not Qualified 我沒資格 by Jia Jia 家家
Not Equal 不等於 by Jia Jia 家家
Checkpoints 闖關 by Victor Wong 品冠
Wide Shoulders 更寬的肩膀 by Victor Wong 品冠

DVD release
* 24 March 2014 : Love Family (DVD) (Taiwan Version) - DVD All Region - Disc: 10 (Ep.1-72) - Publisher: Horng En Culture Co., Ltd. 
Official Taiwan version of the drama DVD set comes in original Mandarin language and Chinese subtitles only.
* 12 March 2014 : Love Family (DVD) (Malaysia Version) - DVD All Region - Disc: 18 (Ep.1-72) - Publisher: Multimedia Entertainment SDN. BHD. 
Malaysia version of the drama DVD set contains 18 disc with complete episodes 1 to 72, comes in original Mandarin language with Chinese, English and Malaysian subtitles.

Broadcast

Episode ratings

:No episode was aired on December 31, 2013 due to SETTV airing New Year's Eve countdown special show.
:Episodes were not broadcast on January 30 and 31, 2014 due to SETTV airing Chinese New Year's special programing.

Awards and nominations
The 2013 Sanlih Drama Awards Ceremony were held on December 22, 2013 at Sanlih's headquarters and broadcasting studios at No. 159, Section 1, Jiuzong Rd, Neihu District Taipei City, Taiwan.

References

External links
Love Family SETTV Website  
Love Family ETTV Website  
Love Family TVB Website  
 

Eastern Television original programming
2013 Taiwanese television series debuts
2014 Taiwanese television series endings
Sanlih E-Television original programming
Taiwanese romance television series